Lancashire was a county constituency of the House of Commons of the Parliament of England from 1290, then of the Parliament of Great Britain from 1707 to 1800, and of the Parliament of the United Kingdom from 1801 to 1832. It was represented by two Members of Parliament, traditionally known as Knights of the Shire until 1832.

The ancient county of Lancashire covers a much larger area than the area now administered by Lancashire County Council. The county town of Lancaster is in the north of the county. The county boundary is further north beyond Carnforth and follows approximately the same boundary as the modern County Council area. The historic county of Lancashire also includes land on the opposite side of Morecambe Bay. Barrow and Furness and the area between Lake Windermere and the River Duddon, and the area west of the River Winster are considered parts of the historic county of Lancashire. Most of the modern district of Ribble Valley is within the boundaries of the historic county of Yorkshire. In the south, the traditional county extends to the River Mersey and Liverpool and follows the Mersey and the River Tame to Ashton-under-Lyne. Most of the southern area of the ancient county now forms the metropolitan counties of Merseyside and Greater Manchester.

The people of the ancient county of Lancashire had been represented in Parliament since at least the 13th Century. It was this period that saw the practice of returning two knights from the shire counties to Parliaments summoned by writ to meet. These were generally regarded as the first assemblies of representatives. At that time Westminster, within the county of Middlesex, had yet to become the permanent home of Parliament. It was the King who decided when and where a Parliament should assemble, and although Westminster was the usual venue, sometimes special circumstances in this period meant Parliaments were summoned to other cities. Early returns have not survived, but the first named representatives of Lancashire, Mattheus de Redman and Johannes de Ewyas are shown in the returns to the Parliament of England summoned to meet at Westminster on 27 November 1295 in the reign of Edward I.

In this early period of Parliamentary history not all Parliaments summoned just shire Knights. Some also required the presence of two representatives of each city and borough. In the 1295 Parliament the two county Members for Lancashire were joined by two Members from each of the four boroughs of Lancaster, Liverpool, Preston and Wigan.

Preston occasionally sent Members to subsequent Parliaments but it was not until the sixteenth century that all four boroughs regularly returned Members to Parliament. At this time Clitheroe and Newton-le-Willows also gained the status of Parliamentary boroughs with each returning two Members. Manchester was granted a town charter in 1301 but had no municipal authority and did not achieve the status of a Parliamentary borough. This was despite the parish of Manchester having a population larger than Liverpool parish by over 100,000 by 1831. Manchester appears in the returns once in the Parliament 1656. This was the second Protectorate Parliament that followed Oliver Cromwell's Instrument of Government that declared Cromwell Lord Protector. The Instrument was an attempt to redistribute seats on a more equitable basis and towns such as Leeds and Manchester gained representation as a result, but this ended following the Restoration.

Lancashire had a total of fourteen Members in the unreformed House of Commons, and this remained the pattern

The constituency was split into two two-member divisions, for Parliamentary purposes, in 1832. The county was then represented by the North Lancashire and South Lancashire constituencies : the latter representing the hundreds of Salford and West Derby, and the former the hundreds of Amounderness, Blackburn, Leyland and Lonsdale.

Boundaries
The constituency comprised the whole historic county of Lancashire, except for the Parliamentary boroughs of Clitheroe, Lancaster, Liverpool, Newton, Preston and Wigan.

Members of Parliament

1290–1653

1653–1659

1660–1832

Constituency abolished (1832)

Elections
The county franchise, from 1430, was held by the adult male owners of freehold land valued at 40 shillings or more. Each elector had as many votes as there were seats to be filled. Votes had to be cast by a spoken declaration, in public, at the hustings, which took place in the county town of Lancaster. The expense and difficulty of voting at only one location in the county, together with the lack of a secret ballot contributed to the corruption and intimidation of electors, which was widespread in the unreformed British political system.

The expense, to candidates, of contested elections encouraged the leading families of the county to agree on the candidates to be returned unopposed whenever possible. Contested county elections were therefore unusual. The Stanleys, led by the Earl of Derby dominated the county. One seat was nearly always held by a Stanley relative, the second, by one of the other leading families.

See also
List of former United Kingdom Parliament constituencies
Unreformed House of Commons

References

Willement's roll of arms

Politics of Lancashire
Parliamentary constituencies in North West England (historic)
Constituencies of the Parliament of the United Kingdom established in 1290
Constituencies of the Parliament of the United Kingdom disestablished in 1832